The 2021 Deutschland Tour was a men's road cycling stage race which took place from 26 to 29 August 2021. It was the 35th edition of the Deutschland Tour, which is rated as a 2.Pro event on the 2021 UCI Europe Tour and the 2021 UCI ProSeries calendars. This edition was the race's first in the UCI ProSeries; the 2020 edition was expected to feature in the inaugural UCI ProSeries but was cancelled due to the COVID-19 pandemic.

Teams 
Nine of the 19 UCI WorldTeams, seven UCI ProTeams, five UCI Continental teams, and the German national team made up the twenty-two teams that participated in the race. , with five riders, was the only team to not enter a full squad of six riders. With  also reduced to five with one late non-starter, 130 riders started the race. Of these riders, only 72 finished.

UCI WorldTeams

 
 
 
 
 
 
 
 
 

UCI ProTeams

 
 
 
 
 
 
 

UCI Continental Teams

 
 
 
 
 

National Teams

 Germany

Schedule

Stages

Stage 1 
26 August 2021 – Stralsund to Schwerin,

Stage 2 
27 August 2021 – Sangerhausen to Ilmenau,

Stage 3 
28 August 2021 – Ilmenau to Erlangen,

Stage 4 
29 August 2021 – Erlangen to Nuremberg,

Classification leadership table 

 On stages 2 and 3, Phil Bauhaus, who was second in the points classification, wore the green jersey, because first-placed Pascal Ackermann wore the red jersey as the leader of the general classification.

Final classification standings

General classification

Points classification

Mountains classification

Young rider classification

Team classification

References

External links 
 

2021
Deutschland Tour
Deutschland Tour
Deutschland Tour
Deutschland Tour